The Dungannon Clubs were founded in Ireland in 1905 by Bulmer Hobson and Dennis McCullough, whose goal was the eventual creation of an Irish Republic.

Seán McDermott became the organizer for the clubs in Belfast, Dublin, Glasgow, London, and various other places in Ulster in 1906.
A club in Carrickmore was organized by Patrick McCartan for a very brief period in 1905, until he went to Dublin to study.

References

Cross-reference

Reference bibliography

Further reading 
 

Clubs and societies in the Republic of Ireland
1905 establishments in Ireland
Irish republican organisations